Dil Mera Dharkan Teri is a 1968 Pakistani Urdu-language musical romance film produced by Murtaza Aftab and directed by M. A. Rasheed. The film cast Waheed Murad, Shamim Ara, Rani, Lehri, Salma Mumtaz, Nighat Sultana and Talish.

In 2017, the film was screened at Lok Virsa Museum in Pakistan.

Plot 
Najma and Shakeel love each other and want to marry. However, Najma's father is against this marriage as Shakeel belongs to a poor family. Najma then decides not to marry as her father is a heart patient. When her father learns that she has decided to never marry because of Shakeel, he suffers a fatal cardiac arrest. After her father's death, she works hard and becomes a doctor.

On the other hand, Shakeel doesn't understand her reason not to marry and blames her considering her unfaithful. Nadira, Shakeel's class fellow who also likes Shakeel and belongs to a rich family becomes close to him after Najma's departure. She teases Shaeekl when Najma doesn't come to him and in return, he slaps her.

One day, Shakeel's mother has a road accident with Najma's car. Najma brings her to the hospital with an engineer which disturbs Shakeel and he blames her, falsely considering that she has married. On the deathbed, Shakeel's mother advises him to marry Nadira and she considers him a good woman for her son. In this way, they get married and after their marriage, Nadira's behavior changes completely and she reveals it to Shakeel that she has just married him to avenge his earlier slap. Shakeel then leaves home, falls on the road due to weakness and is taken to the clinic where Najma (who is a doctor in the clinic) discovers that he is suffering from Tuberculosis. She decides to bring him back to a healthy life and for this purpose, she takes the help of Shahid, Shakeel's close friend. Najma disguises herself as a nurse and looks after him, considering that he hates her now and will not even like to see her. Shahid also tells him about Najma that she has not yet married due to him and she was compelled just like he was, due to his mother's last wish. When he recovers completely and leaves the hospital, Najma sings the same song that he used to sing for her from which he realises that she is her Najma and both reunite.

Cast 
 Waheed Murad - Shakeel
 Shamim Ara - Najma
 Rani - Nadira
 Lehri
 Salma Mumtaz
 Nighat Sultana
 Talish

Release
Dil Mera Dharkan Teri was released by Naila Films on 1 April 1968, in Pakistani cinemas. The film completed 18 weeks on the main cinema and 58 weeks on the other cinemas in Karachi and thus became a golden jubilee film.

Remake 
Its TV remake was made in 2013 with the same name, which starred Ahsan Khan, Sanam Saeed, Sarwat Gilani, directed by Mehreen Jabbar and produced by Humayun Saeed.

Music
The music was composed by Master Inayat Hussain and the songs were written by Qateel Shifai. Playback singers are Ahmed Rushdi, Mala, Mehdi Hassan and Masood Rana.

Songography
Kiya Hai Jo Pyar Tau Padega Nibhana by Ahmed Rushdi
Kiya Hai Jo Pyar Tau Padega Nibhana by Ahmed Rushdi and Mala
Dil ka dard beich ke... by Mala
Rooth gayi kyun mujh se... by Ahmed Rushdi and Mala
Guzrey na sham akeli... by Ahmed Rushdi and Mala
Ab to aaja keh tujhe yaad kiya hai dil ne... by Mehdi Hassan
Jhoom aye dil woh mera jaan-e-bahar aaye ga... by Masood Rana

References

External links

1960s Urdu-language films
1968 films
Pakistani black-and-white films
Pakistani romantic drama films
Urdu-language Pakistani films